Marcelo "Cello" Dias is a Brazilian musician. He is the bassist of Against All Will and former bassist of Soulfly.

Biography

The Mist 

Dias began his career in 1988 playing bass for the Brazilian thrash metal band The Mist, who had just changed their name from Mayhem following a number of lineup changes. On their first album Phantasmagoria released in 1989, they most notably featured Chakal singer Vladimir Korg on vocals and boasted a twin guitar lineup displaying a progressive mix of aggressive thrash and gothic atmosphere. For their second album, 1991's The Hangman Tree, former Sepultura guitarist Jairo Guedz took over full guitar duties for the band, reducing the band to a four-piece whilst further expanding the unique sound of the debut. Vocalist Korg left after the second album, further reducing the lineup to a trio for which Marcelo took over vocal duties for their third album, Ashes to Ashes, Dust to Dust, released in 1993 which showed the band adopting a more contemporary groove metal sound. Following this release, Marcelo left the band and was replaced by Cassiano Gobbet on both bass and vocals for their final album, 1995's Gottverlassen before splitting in 1997.

Soulfly 

Following this, Dias (a.k.a. Marcello D. Rapp) found international fame as the former bass player for the metal veteran band Soulfly. His collaborations in the band's first three albums (Soulfly, Primitive and 3) were essential and indeed established his professional level earned him certified RIAA gold records in the US as well in oversea countries, selling more than two million copies worldwide.

With Soulfly, they incorporated many styles of metal with Brazilian tribal and world music. Cello had his first three studio albums debut on the US Billboard 200, with a peak position at number 32 for their second album, Primitive. Their debut album, Soulfly, was certified gold by the RIAA.

Abloom 

Along with bandmates Mikey Doling, Roy Mayorga and One Side Zero's Jasan Radford and Levon Sultanian, they formed Abloom. Performing shows from California to New York, they achieved quickly national status for an unsigned band. With System of a Down bassist's Shavo Odadjian as their executive producer, they recorded a full-length album on their own, with an open agenda to negotiate any future deals. Currently, Abloom is on hiatus but are looking to start up again in the near future.

Against All Will 

As Cello's current band, Against All Will consists of Puddle of Mudd's main songwriter Jimmy Allen on guitars, Jeff Current (Seven Story Drop) on vocals and Phillip Gonyea (Instinct of Aggression) on drums. The band finished their independent album A Rhyme & Reason in December 2009 and performed shows throughout the country in Spring 2010.

In 2005, he appeared as one of the bass players on the Roadrunner United compilation CD, The All-Star Sessions, along with Fear Factory guitarist Dino Cazares, Roy Mayorga (Stone Sour), Andreas Kisser (Sepultura), and many others.

Equipment 
ESP – MD 500 Signature Bass
Fernandes Gravity 5 Deluxe
Ampeg SVT 4 Pro Bass Amplifier and SVT 810E cabinet
Morley Pedals
Tech21 Sans Amp PSA1
DR Strings
Monster Cables

Discography 

Full-length releases
1989: The Mist – Phantasmagoria (Cogumelo Records)
1991: The Mist – The Hangman Tree (Cogumelo Records)
1993: The Mist – Ashes to Ashes, Dust to Dust (Cogumelo Records)
1998: Soulfly – Soulfly (Roadrunner Records)
2000: Soulfly – Primitive (Roadrunner Records)
2002: Soulfly – 3 (Roadrunner Records)
2004: Abloom – Abloom (independent)
2009: Agony – Devil's Breath (independent)

Singles
1998: "Umbabarauma" (Jorge Ben cover)
1998: "Bleed" (feat. Fred Durst)
2000: "Back to the Primitive"

Videos
1998: Bleed
2000: Back to the Primitive
2002: Seek 'n' Strike

Guest participations
2005: Roadrunner United – The All-Star Sessions (Roadrunner Records)

References 

Brazilian heavy metal bass guitarists
Male bass guitarists
Brazilian rock musicians
Living people
People from São Caetano do Sul
Soulfly members
Year of birth missing (living people)